Essertines may refer to:

Essertines-sur-Rolle, Vaud, Switzerland
Essertines-sur-Yverdon, Vaud, Switzerland